Superior Township is one of twelve townships in Dickinson County, Iowa, USA.  As of the 2000 census, its population was 300.

History
Superior Township was formed in 1872.

Geography
According to the United States Census Bureau, Superior Township covers an area of 28.65 square miles (74.2 square kilometers); of this, 28.13 square miles (72.87 square kilometers, 98.21 percent) is land and 0.52 square miles (1.34 square kilometers, 1.81 percent) is water.

Cities, towns, villages
 Superior (vast majority)

Adjacent townships
 Emmet Township, Emmet County (east)
 Estherville Township, Emmet County (southeast)
 Richland Township (south)
 Center Grove Township (southwest)
 Spirit Lake Township (west)

Cemeteries
The township contains Superior Township Cemetery.

Major highways
  U.S. Route 71

Lakes
 Swan Lake

School districts
 Estherville Lincoln Central Com School District
 Spirit Lake Community School District

Political districts
 Iowa's 5th congressional district
 State House District 06
 State Senate District 03

References
 United States Census Bureau 2007 TIGER/Line Shapefiles
 United States Board on Geographic Names (GNIS)
 United States National Atlas

External links

 
US-Counties.com
City-Data.com

Townships in Dickinson County, Iowa
Townships in Iowa
1872 establishments in Iowa
Populated places established in 1872